Cyberware is a relatively new and unknown field (a proto-science, or more adequately a "proto-technology"). In science fiction circles, however, it is commonly known to mean the hardware or machine parts implanted in the human body and acting as an interface between the central nervous system and the computers or machinery connected to it.

More formally:
Cyberware is technology that attempts to create a working interface between machines/computers and the human nervous system, including the brain.

Examples of potential cyberware cover a wide range, but current research tends to approach the field from one of two different angles: interfaces or prosthetics.

Interfaces ("Headware")

The first variety attempts to connect directly with the brain. The data-jack is probably the best-known, having heavily featured in works of fiction (even in mainstream productions such as Johnny Mnemonic, the cartoon Exosquad, and  The Matrix). It is the most difficult object to implement, but it is also the most important in terms of interfacing directly with the mind. In science fiction the data-jack is the envisioned I/O port for the brain. Its job is to translate thoughts into something meaningful to a computer, and to translate something from a computer into meaningful thoughts for humans. Once perfected, it would allow direct communication between computers and the human mind.

Large university laboratories conduct most of the experiments done in the area of direct neural interfaces. For ethical reasons, the tests are usually performed on animals or slices of brain tissue from donor brains. The mainstream research focuses on electrical impulse monitoring, recording and translating the many different electrical signals that the brain transmits. A number of companies are working on what is essentially a "hands-free" mouse or keyboard. This technology uses these brain signals to control computer functions. These interfaces are sometimes called brain-machine interfaces (BMI).

The more intense research, concerning full in-brain interfaces, is being studied, but is in its infancy. Few can afford the huge cost of such enterprises, and those who can find the work slow-going and very far from the ultimate goals. Research has reached the level where limited control over a computer is possible using thought commands alone.  After being implanted with a Massachusetts-based firm Cyberkinetics chip called BrainGate, a quadriplegic man was able to compose and check email.

Prosthetics ("Bodyware")

The second variety of cyberware consists of a more modern form of the rather old field of prosthetics. Modern prostheses attempt to deliver a natural functionality and appearance. In the sub-field where prosthetics and cyberware cross over, experiments have been done where microprocessors, capable of controlling the movements of an artificial limb, are attached to the severed nerve-endings of the patient. The patient is then taught how to operate the prosthetic, trying to learn how to move it as though it were a natural limb.

Crossing over between prostheses and interfaces are those pieces of equipment attempting to replace lost senses. An early success in this field is the cochlear implant. A tiny device inserted into the inner ear, it replaces the functionality of damaged, or missing, hair cells (the cells that, when stimulated, create the sensation of sound). This device comes firmly under the field of prosthetics, but experiments are also being performed to tap into the brain. Coupled with a speech-processor, this could be a direct link to the speech centres of the brain.

See also

 Biomechatronics
 Biorobotics
 Brain–computer interface
 Brain-reading
 Central nervous system
 Cybernetics
 Cyborg
 Cyborgs in fiction
 Neural engineering
 Neuroprosthetics
 Neurosecurity
 Posthumanization
 Simulated reality
 Transhuman
 Wetware (brain)

References

External links
 The open-source programmable chip Electroencephalography project
 The programmable chip Electroencephalography project BLog
 The open-source Electroencephalography project
 Cyberware Technology by Taryn East - Source containing the rest of the work found on this article
 Department of Membrane and Neurophysics at the Max-Planck-Institute in Martinsried, Germany - an institute working on nerve cell/chip interconnection
 Wetware Technology

Brain–computer interfacing
Neuroprosthetics